Piano Concerto No. 5 refers to the fifth piano concerto written by one of a number of composers:

Piano Concerto No. 5 (Bach) in F minor, (BWV 1056)
Piano Concerto No. 5 (Beethoven) in E-flat major, Emperor
Piano Concerto No. 5 (Field) in C major, L'incendie par l'orage
Piano Concerto No. 5 (Herz) in F minor
Piano Concerto No. 5 (Litolff) in C minor
Piano Concerto No. 5 (Moscheles) in C major
Piano Concerto No. 5 (Mozart) in D major
Piano Concerto No. 5 (Prokofiev) in G major
Piano Concerto No. 5 (Ries) in D major, Concerto Pastorale
Piano Concerto No. 5 (Rubinstein) in E-flat major
Piano Concerto No. 5 (Saint-Saëns) in F major, Egyptian
Piano Concerto No. 5 (Villa-Lobos)

See also
 List of compositions for piano and orchestra